A by-election for the seat of Swan in the Legislative Assembly of Western Australia was held on 29 April 1944. It was triggered by the death of the sitting member, Richard Sampson of the Country Party, on 16 February 1944. The election was won by Ray Owen, who finished with 60.0 of the two-candidate-preferred vote standing as an "Independent Country" candidate. The runner-up was Howard Sampson, a brother of the deceased member.

Background
A member of the Country Party, Richard Sampson had held Swan since the 1921 state election, and briefly served as a minister under James Mitchell. He died in office on 16 February 1944, aged 66. After his death, the writ for the by-election was issued on 21 March, with the close of nominations on 3 April. Polling day was on 29 April, with the writ returned on 18 May.

Results

Aftermath
Owen joined three other independents in parliament (Horace Berry, Lionel Kelly, and Harry Shearn), although Labor's comfortable majority meant they had little influence. At the 1947 state election, Owen was narrowly defeated by Gerald Wild of the Liberal Party. He joined the Country Party in 1949, and at the 1950 state election won the seat of Darling Range, which he would hold until 1962.

See also
 List of Western Australian state by-elections

References

Western Australian state by-elections
1944 elections in Australia
April 1944 events
1940s in Western Australia